Old Black is a mountain in the Great Smoky Mountains, located in the Southeastern United States.  While often overshadowed by Mount Guyot, its higher neighbor to the south, Old Black is the 5th-highest mountain in Tennessee and the 7th-highest in the Great Smoky Mountains National Park. The Appalachian Trail crosses its western slope, connecting the Cosby-area trail system with the heart of the Eastern Smokies.

Like much of the Smokies crest, Old Black lies along the border between Tennessee and North Carolina, with Cocke County and Sevier County to the west and Haywood County to the east. Old Black is part of the Guyot massif, which extends deep into the interior of the Smokies. A ridge known as Pinnacle Lead intersects this massif— which comprises the eastern section of the crest of the Smokies— on the western slope of Old Black, giving Old Black a triangular shape similar to that of Tricorner Knob to the south.

Old Black gets its name from the dense Southern Appalachian spruce-fir forest that coats its higher elevations.  From afar, this forest takes on a dark green character, especially in cooler months when contrasted with the brown hardwood forest in lower elevations.  This forest also adds to Old Black's blunt appearance— that of a low pyramid with a wide base.

Geology 

Old Black comprises Thunderhead sandstone, a type of Precambrian metamorphic rock common throughout the Smokies. The rock is part of the Ocoee Supergroup, which was formed from ocean sediments nearly a billion years ago.  The mountain was created over 200 million years ago during the Appalachian orogeny, when the North American and African plates collided, thrusting the rock upward.

History 

Arnold Guyot first measured the elevation of Old Black on his survey of the crest of the Smokies in the late 1850s. While Guyot initially named the mountain "Mount Henry" after the director of the Smithsonian Institution, "Old Black" was the name that stuck.

Laura Thornborough, a writer who made several excursions to the area in the 1930s, recalled the thick spruce forest that dominates in the Eastern Smokies:

In 1984, an F-4 Phantom fighter plane crashed into the ridge between Inadu Knob and Old Black. Some of the wreckage from this crash remains scattered about the area, with a number of fragments located in an area along the Appalachian Trail about a quarter-mile west of the trail's junction with the Snake Den Ridge Trail.  A short spur trail winds through the wreckage.

In 1935, the CCC constructed a segment of the Appalachian Trail across the western slope of Old Black.

Access 

Like most of the key peaks of the Eastern Smokies, Old Black can only be reached via a lengthy hike. From this junction, Old Black is nearly a mile to the northwest. The trail comes to within less than a 10th of a mile from the summit, but the thickness of the forest atop the mountain will considerably slow any bushwhack attempt, and make off-trail navigation difficult.

As the Appalachian Trail crosses Old Black's western slope, various clearings allow for views of Cocke County and Sevier County, Tennessee to the north and northwest.  Along the mountain's northeast slope, near a clearing used for a high-altitude helicopter landing pad, much of the Eastern Smokies and the Balsam Mountains can be seen, including Mount Sterling and Luftee Knob.  Some of the finest views of Mount Guyot can be seen from this point.

References

External links
 Great Smoky Mountains Trail Map - Large file in .pdf format.
 South Beyond 6000 in the Eastern Smokies - Information provided by the Carolina Hiking Club for climbing Old Black and other nearby high peaks.

Mountains of Great Smoky Mountains National Park
Mountains on the Appalachian Trail
Mountains of Tennessee
Mountains of North Carolina
Southern Sixers
Natural history of the Great Smoky Mountains
Protected areas of Cocke County, Tennessee
Protected areas of Haywood County, North Carolina
Protected areas of Sevier County, Tennessee
Mountains of Cocke County, Tennessee
Mountains of Haywood County, North Carolina
Mountains of Sevier County, Tennessee